Kingston is the name of several places in the world. The most populated places named Kingston are:

 Kingston, Jamaica (population )
 Kingston upon Hull, England (population )
 City of Kingston, Victoria, Australia (population )
 Kingston, Ontario, Canada (population )
 Kingston upon Thames, England (population )

List of places
The following places are named Kingston:

Australia
Kingston, Australian Capital Territory, suburb of Canberra
Kingston, Norfolk Island, capital of the territory
Kingston, Queensland, suburb of Logan City
Kingston SE, a locality in South Australia 
Kingston District Council, a local government area
Kingston On Murray, South Australia
Kingston Estate, a winery
Kingston, Tasmania, town south of Hobart
Kingston, Victoria, town near Creswick
City of Kingston, local government area in Victoria
Division of Kingston, federal electoral district covering southern Adelaide suburbs

Canada
Kingston, New Brunswick
Kingston Parish, New Brunswick
Kingston Peninsula
Kingston, Newfoundland and Labrador
Kingston, Nova Scotia
Kingston, Ontario, largest city of this name in Canada
Kingston, Ontario Inner Harbour
Kingston (electoral district), a former federal district in Ontario
Kingston (provincial electoral district), a former riding in Ontario
Kingston City, a federal electoral district
Kingston and the Islands, a federal electoral district
Kingston and the Islands (provincial electoral district)
Kingston Airfield (1929–1942)
Kingston Norman Rogers Airport
Kingston, Prince Edward Island

Guyana
Kingston, Guyana, a ward of Georgetown

Jamaica
Kingston, Jamaica, capital of the country
Kingston Parish

New Zealand
Kingston, New Zealand, small town at the southernmost end of Lake Wakatipu
Kingston, Wellington

United Kingdom

England
 Kingston, Milton Keynes, Buckinghamshire
 Kingston, Cambridgeshire
 Kingston, Devon, near Modbury
 Kingston, East Devon, a location in Devon
 Kingston, Kingswear, a location in Devon
 Kingston, Staverton, Devon
 Kingston, North Dorset, a hamlet in Hazelbury Bryan
 Kingston, Purbeck, Dorset
 Kingston upon Hull (commonly just Hull), East Riding of Yorkshire
 Kingston near Lewes, East Sussex
 Kingston upon Thames, Greater London (formerly Surrey)
 Kingston Vale with Kingston Hill, a district in the borough
 Kingston-upon-Thames (UK Parliament constituency)
 Kingston upon Thames (parish)
 Royal Borough of Kingston upon Thames 
 Kingston and Surbiton (UK Parliament constituency)
 Kingston, Greater Manchester, a location
 Kingston, Hampshire, in Portsmouth
 Kingston, West Hampshire, a location
 Kingston, Isle of Wight
 Kingston, Kent
 Kingston Bagpuize, Oxfordshire (formerly in Berkshire)
 Kingston Blount, Oxfordshire
 Kingston, Suffolk, a location
 Kingston by Ferring (and Kingston Gorse), Arun District, West Sussex
 Kingston by Sea (or Kingston Buci), Adur District, West Sussex
Kingston Buci, electoral district
 Kingston on Soar, Nottinghamshire
 Kingston Seymour, Somerset
 Kingston St Mary, Somerset

Scotland
Kingston, East Lothian
Kingston, Glasgow, district of Glasgow from which the Kingston Bridge takes its name
Kingston, Moray

United States

Kingston, Autauga County, Alabama
Kingston, Arkansas
Kingston, California, in Kings County
Kingston, Georgia
Kingston, Idaho
Kingston, Illinois, a village in DeKalb County
Kingston, Adams County, Illinois
Kingston, Indiana
Kingston, Iowa
Kingston, Louisiana
Kingston, Maryland, an unincorporated community in Somerset County
Kingston (Upper Marlboro, Maryland)
Kingston, Massachusetts 
Kingston (CDP), Massachusetts
Kingston, Michigan
Kingston, Minnesota
Kingston, Mississippi
Kingston, Missouri
Kingston Estates, New Jersey
Kingston, Nevada
Kingston Airport (Nevada)
Kingston, New Hampshire
Kingston, New Jersey
Kingston, New Mexico
Kingston, New York, original capital of the state of New York
Kingston–Ulster Airport
Kingston (town), New York
Kingston, Ohio
Kingston Center, Ohio
Kingston, Oklahoma
Kingston, Oregon
Kingston, Pennsylvania
Kingston, Rhode Island
 Kingston station (Rhode Island)
Kingston, Tennessee
Kingston, Texas
Kingston, Utah
Kingston, Washington
Kingston, West Virginia

Kingston, Wisconsin, a village in Green Lake County
Kingston, Green Lake County, Wisconsin
Kingston, Juneau County, Wisconsin
West Kingston, Rhode Island

See also
Kingston (disambiguation)
Kingston Road (disambiguation)
Kingston Bridge (disambiguation)
Kingstone (disambiguation)
Kington (disambiguation)
Kingtown (disambiguation)
Kingstown (disambiguation)
Kinston (disambiguation)

Lists of places sharing the same name